Romania began submitting for the Academy Award for Best International Feature Film in 1966. As of 2022 , Romania has submitted thirty-eight films for Oscar consideration, scoring its first nomination for Collective at the 93rd Academy Awards.

The Best Foreign Film award is handed out annually by the United States Academy of Motion Picture Arts and Sciences to a feature-length motion picture produced outside the United States that contains primarily non-English dialogue.

The Romanian nominee is selected each year by a jury selected by the National Center for Cinematography (Centrul Naţional al Cinematografiei (CNC))

Submissions
The Academy of Motion Picture Arts and Sciences has invited the film industries of various countries to submit their best film for the Academy Award for Best Foreign Language Film since 1956. The Foreign Language Film Award Committee oversees the process and reviews all the submitted films. Following this, they vote via secret ballot to determine the five nominees for the award. Below is a list of the films that have been submitted by Romania for review by the Academy for the award since 1966, by year and the respective Academy Awards ceremony. Romania did not enter the competition every year, including a six-year absence from 1977-1982.

Sergiu Nicolaescu's films have been chosen to represent Romania five times since 1969, including once after the Revolution. All films were primarily in Romanian.

Among Romania's more notable nominees include:

 Carnival Scenes, which was produced in 1981 and probably banned by Romania's Communist regime, and eventually released in 1989 after the Romanian Revolution.
 The Rest is Silence, the most expensive film in Romanian history 
 4 Months, 3 Weeks and 2 Days, the first Romanian winner of the Palme d'Or at the Cannes Film Festival, was not shortlisted, creating controversy among critics and online film fans  The controversy caused an Academy member to pledge nomination reform, though the category had often sparked criticism.

See also
 List of Academy Award winners and nominees for Best Foreign Language Film
 List of Academy Award-winning foreign language films
 List of Romanian films
 Cinema of Romania

Notes

References

External links
The Official Academy Awards Database
The Motion Picture Credits Database
IMDb Academy Awards Page

Romania
Academy Award
Romanian Submissions For The Academy Award For Best Foreign Language Film